Dale Meinert (December 18, 1933 – May 10, 2004) was a professional American football player. He played ten seasons in the National Football League for the Chicago/St. Louis Cardinals. Meinert was a three  time pro bowler at middle linebacker.  Previously he played three seasons with the Edmonton Eskimos of the Canadian Football League. He died after a long battle with Alzheimer's disease.

References

External links

 
 

1933 births
2004 deaths
People from Lone Wolf, Oklahoma
Players of American football from Oklahoma
American football linebackers
Oklahoma State Cowboys football players
Chicago Cardinals players
St. Louis Cardinals (football) players
Eastern Conference Pro Bowl players
American players of Canadian football
Canadian football linebackers
Edmonton Elks players
Deaths from Alzheimer's disease